"Dip It Low" is a song by American singer Christina Milian from her second studio album, It's About Time (2004). Written by Poli Paul and Teedra Moses and produced by Paul, the track was released as the album's lead single. Matt Ward and Dean Gallard provided additional production for the song with Ne-Yo working on vocal arrangements. While the original version of the song, featuring American rapper Fabolous, was only given a release in the United States, Canada, Ireland, and the United Kingdom, the remix featuring German rapper Samy Deluxe was released in Austria, Finland, France, Germany, Sweden, and Switzerland. A solo version was released in Australia, Belgium, Denmark, the Netherlands, New Zealand, and Norway.

Background
The single is Milian's most successful to date, reaching number five on the US Billboard Hot 100 chart as well as the top five in the United Kingdom and the top ten in the Denmark, the Netherlands, New Zealand, and Norway. Milian also performed and promoted the song for a Tommy Hilfiger Jeans commercial. The song was nominated for the Grammy Award for Best Rap/Sung Collaboration in 2005, and was certified gold by the Recording Industry Association of America in early January 2005. It remains Milian's biggest hit single in the US to date, and her only one to reach the top 10 of the Billboard Hot 100.

Legal issues
In August 2006, Milian sued the co-writer and producer of "Dip It Low", Poli Paul, claiming that Paul "very definitively" assured her that "there were no samples whatsoever in [...] 'Dip It Low'". The issue had arisen in February 2005, when Thomas Turino, Larry Crook, and Dan Dickey sued Milian over the song, claiming that it contained a sample from a track they released in 1983 called "La Sirena". The lawsuit claimed that Paul heard the album while in a record store, liked the tune and sampled twelve seconds of it for "Dip It Low". These twelve seconds are repeated in a loop throughout the entire song. This suit was successful and the plaintiffs recovered over a million dollars (after lawyer expenses) divided 40% for Turino (the composer of the theme of the song), and 30% each for Dickey and Crook.  Milian claimed that she had to spend more than $300,000 defending herself in the case, which she settled in 2006, and wanted $300,000 plus damages from Paul and his associate, Spencer Cowlings Entertainment. In November 2006, Paul countersued the Island Def Jam Music Group and its parent company, Universal Music Group. Paul alleged that Island Def Jam was "negligent in its obligation to obtain clearance and proper licensing for any copyrighted material" used on the album. In February 2006, a superior court judge ruled that Paul's attorneys had failed to file a sworn declaration in the given period of time, but allowed them to file an amended complaint. Paul's lawyers amended the countersuit and added Milian as a defendant, saying that she was also negligent and that she should compensate him for money he spent in the copyright action. In June 2006, Universal Music Group filed a breach-of-contract suit against Milian and Paul. The record label claimed it was forced to pay attorney fees as a result of the litigation between Milian and Paul. The suit also said that Paul owes the company attorneys' fees from an earlier federal court case involving "Dip It Low".

Music video
The music video for "Dip It Low" was directed by Matthew Rolston. Milian is first seen sitting scantily-clad in an East Asian-themed room. She is solely wearing a bra and underwear with a robe and high heels. She dances and sings, and clips of her dressed in a sparkling green costume cut in throughout the video. She is seen in a revealing red dress, walking forward on a stage with two dancers and then begins to dance. One of the male dancers then pulls back the front of the dress, revealing a black dress underneath. Throughout the rest of the video she is shown being pulled through black paint in the black dress and continues to dance, in addition to impressive dance moves where she falls directly onto her back, unhurt. The verse that features Fabolous is completely cut out in the video, and instead a dance sequence is shown. 

Different versions of the music video were created to market different remixes of the song. These videos are nearly identical to the original video but feature separate footage of their respective featured artist. One video was produced for a version of the song which features German rapper Samy Deluxe.  A reggaeton remix video of the song featuring Puerto Rican rapper Voltio was made, and an Asian remix video featuring Will Pan was shown on Channel V. Another version of the video features Russian rapper Detsl.

Track listings

Notes
 denotes additional producer

Personnel
Personnel are adapted from the It's About Time album booklet. 

 Poli Paul – composition, production
 Teedra Moses – composition, background vocals
 Christina Milian – lead vocals, background vocals
 Collin Miller – recording engineering
 Manny Marroquin – mix engineering
 Matt Ward – additional and remix production
 Dean Gillard – additional and remix production
 Shaffer "Ne-Yo" Smith – vocal arrangement
 Fabolous – featured vocals

Charts

Weekly charts

Year-end charts

Certifications

Release history

References

External links
 

2004 singles
2004 songs
Christina Milian songs
Fabolous songs
Island Records singles
Music videos directed by Matthew Rolston
Songs about dancing
Songs written by Fabolous
Songs written by Teedra Moses